Antoniów  is a village in the administrative district of Gmina Bałtów within Ostrowiec County, Świętokrzyskie Voivodeship in south-central Poland.

The village has a population of 130 people.

References

Villages in Ostrowiec County